Fat Rice was an American restaurant inspired by the food and culture of Macau, China. Located in the Logan Square neighborhood of Chicago, Illinois. Operating from 2012 to 2020. Fat Rice was known for their Arroz Gordo, a home-style Macanese dish which translates to "fat rice". Then-head chef Abraham Conlon once claimed Fat Rice is the "only restaurant in the world" to serve the dish.

Background 
During the onset of pandemic lockdown, Fat Rice Restaurant which was founded in 2012 closed down normal operations in March 2020.  

A new business was opened a month later, called Super Fat Rice Mart which was offering meal kits and grocery items for at home cooking. This was an alternative strategy---instead of going to the restaurant to take out food, the food (grocery items or farm-fresh produce) will be delivered to the customers’ residence.  After a year, the restaurant was renamed as NoodleBird at Fat Rice -  a fast casual concept with a focus on select Fat Rice signature dishes with counter service and delivery options. 

Fat Food Productions, a food, beverage, and hospitality platform which empowers the team members to pursue excellence and knowledge of hospitality industry in a nurturing and positive environment, was established during pandemic lockdown. The owners of Fat Rice reconceived their restaurant into Fat Food Productions with three new production lines---food takeout from NoodleBird at Fat Rice (an Asian-inspired diner), bottled cocktails from The Chicago Spirit, and flavored sauces that are handmade, naturally fermented, small-batch, gluten-free, low sugar, and preservative-free from Unbelievable Hot Sauce.

NoodleBird at Fat Rice does not run like a full-service restaurant , but instead, it has a fast casual approach and is open throughout the day.

Philanthropy   
During the COVID-19 pandemic lockdown, Fat Rice owners launched the Fat Rice Community Relief Kitchen to help their staff, other restaurant workers, and Fat Rice customers. Conlon and Lo provided meal kits which were offered at whatever price people could afford to pay. Those meal kits were either delivered or taken out, considering people’s safety. Each meal kit intended to supply three meals to two people contained tofu and vegetable soup, pork meatloaf with mushrooms, and marinated chicken thighs with vegetables.  

Their mission was to help flatten the curve of coronavirus outbreak and to help those people who were financially struggling due to restaurant closures.

The Owners 
Fat Rice, now NoodleBird at Fat Rice , is owned and managed by the business partners---Abraham Conlon, a James Beard Foundation award winner , and Adrienne Lo, a Chinese American and Chicago native. Both have culinary roots. 

Fat Rice also operated an adjacent cocktail bar, called The Ladies' Room and an Asian-inspired pastry shop called The Bakery at Fat Rice.

Awards 

 Bon Appétit – #4 Best new Restaurant in the United States, 2013.
 Time Out Chicago – Best New Restaurant, Eat Out Awards, 2013
 Eater – Fat Rice as one of America’s 38 Essential restaurants, 2014
 The Jean Banchet Awards for Culinary Excellence – Best new Restaurant in Chicago, 2016.

Leadership controversy
The restaurant's owners, Abe Conlon and Adrienne Lo, made two Instagram posts in solidarity with those participating in the George Floyd protests in early June 2020. Conlon issued an apology for his behavior on Instagram, and shut Super Fat Rice Mart  indefinitely after the criticism.

References

Restaurants established in 2012
Defunct restaurants in Chicago
2012 establishments in Illinois
2020 disestablishments in Illinois
Restaurants disestablished in 2020